The Flying K Sky Raider is a family of American, high wing, strut-braced, single engine, conventional landing gear ultralight aircraft that was designed by Ken Schrader and produced by Flying K Enterprises and later Sky Raider LLC of Caldwell, Idaho for amateur construction.

Design and development
First flown in 1996, the original Sky Raider is a single seater designed as an FAR 103 Ultralight Vehicles compliant aircraft with an empty weight within that category's  empty weight limit, when equipped with a light enough engine. The Sky Raider can also be built in the US homebuilt and light-sport aircraft categories and in the United Kingdom as a BCAR Section S microlight. The design was developed from the Avid Flyer and the Denney Kitfox and the designer formerly worked for both those companies.

The aircraft has a 4130 steel tube frame fuselage and a wing constructed from aluminium tubing, all covered in doped fabric. The wings are equipped with slotted-style flaps and fold for transport or storage without a requirement to disconnect the  flaps and ailerons. The landing gear is bungee suspended. The Sky Raider has a fully enclosed cockpit design, allowing flying in cooler weather. The Sky Raider is available as a kit, including quick-build options, including a pre-welded fuselage and quick-build wings.

The Sky Raider can be equipped with floats and skis.

Variants
Sky Raider
Original single seat high wing US FAR Part 103 ultralight powered by a  Rotax 277 or homebuilt powered by  Rotax 447 engine. Production completed
Sky Raider II
Engines used include the two-stroke  Rotax 503 and the four-stroke   HKS 700E engine. Described as an "intimate tandem two seater" due to the small rear seat space. Production completed.
Super Sky Raider
Engines used include the   Jabiru 2200 engine. In production, with fifty completed and flying by 2011.
Frontier
Engines used include the  Lycoming O-290 engine and the  Jabiru 2200. Floats are optional. In production, with two completed and flying by 2011, the construction time is estimated at 300–400 hours.

Specifications (Sky Raider)

See also

References

External links

1990s United States ultralight aircraft
Light-sport aircraft